HMAS Uki (FY.80) was an auxiliary minesweeper operated by the Royal Australian Navy during World War II. Laid down at Lithgows, Port Glasgow, Scotland in 1923, Uki was owned and operated by the Sydney-based North Coast Steam Navigation Company. On 3 November 1939, Uki was requisitioned by the RAN for use as an auxiliary.

During the war, Uki, and  made up Group 77 Minesweeper, based at HMAS Maitland, in Newcastle, New South Wales. In March 1943, Uki was requisitioned into the United States Navy.

After being returned to her owners, she was sold to M. Bern & Co in 1954. She was hulked in Brisbane in 1960. She was later stripped and scuttled off Tangalooma, Queensland in June 1976.

Citations

References 
 Naval Historical Society of Australia: On this day – 1939

1923 ships
Minesweepers of the Royal Australian Navy
Ships built on the River Clyde
Scuttled vessels of Australia
Iron and steel steamships of Australia
Coastal trading vessels of Australia